Turkey Time is a 1970 British television production by the BBC.

Cast
 Richard Briers as David Winterton
 Arthur Lowe as Edwin Stoatt
 Eunice Gayson as Louise Stoatt
 Mollie Sugden as Mrs. Pike
 Elizabeth Knight as Rose Adair
 Gladys Henson as Mrs. Gather
 Terence Alexander as Max Wheeler
 Toke Townley as Luke Meate
 Margot Field as Ernestine Stoatt
 Betty Hare as Mrs. Ratchett
 Derek Sydney as Warwick Westbourne
 Keith Ashley as Man in the shelter
 Alec Ross as PC Tidball

Adaptation
The BBC's production was based on the play Turkey Time, one of the Aldwych farces, by Ben Travers.

Release
First transmitted by the BBC on 3 October 1970, Turkey Time was made in colour on 2" videotape, but survives only as a monochrome 16mm film print.

References

External links

1970 television plays
Aldwych farce
BBC television comedy
British television films